Anne Brit Stråtveit (born 22 April 1947) is a Norwegian teacher and politician for the Christian Democratic Party.

She was born in Farsund, and took a teacher's education. She worked as a teacher in Farsund from 1969 to 1970, Sandnes from 1970 to 1975 and Lyngdal from 1975 to 1992 before becoming a school adviser.

She was elected to the Parliament of Norway from Vest-Agder in 1997, but was not re-elected in 2001. She was a member of the Standing Committee on Education, Research and Church Affairs from 1997 to 2000 and the Standing Committee on Defence from 2000 to 2001. She was a member of Lyngdal municipality council from 1995 to 1997 and 2003 to 2007.

References

1947 births
Living people
People from Farsund
People from Lyngdal
Norwegian educators
Members of the Storting
Christian Democratic Party (Norway) politicians
Vest-Agder politicians
Women members of the Storting
21st-century Norwegian politicians
21st-century Norwegian women politicians
20th-century Norwegian politicians
20th-century Norwegian women politicians